Michael John William Green (7 August 1929 - 1 October 2022) was a British painter and sculptor. He moved from an initial career in theatre to art in his mid-thirties, was an autodidactic as a painter but had from his very early years a natural talent in painting and drawing.
 He lived in London and in Molini di Triora.

Life and career

Early life
Green was born in Nyasaland, East Africa (now Malawi) where he spent his first seven and a half years before coming to England for his Public School education. At the age of 15 he was awarded the Vicountess Northcliffe Scholarship at RADA (London) and initially worked in the theatre and moved to New York City when he was 23.

Career
After theatre work in Manhattan, he moved into product and decorative design work. Only at the age of 36 did he realise that he had made the wrong career choice at the age of 15. He then decided that he had to be a professional painter and quickly moved from representative painting to abstraction.
He was Artist in Residence at the Indiana State University (1978), giving master classes on advanced painting and lectures on colour theory. 
In 1986, he gave up his New York studio and moved back to London. He set up a studio in the old Spratt's Dog Biscuit factory, where he began his first sculptures.

Style
He moved into abstraction soon after working figuratively, searching for a personal visual language and set up his first studio in SoHo  while still only an avant-garde artist area. Established second studio in Northern Italy, thus preserving a 'European' ethos. 
His pre-occupation as an abstract painter for four decades has been with space. Not the astronaut's space but the space of the mind, an intellectual infinity. Lacking nature's spatial indicators (sky, perspective, horizon) idiomatic alternatives were needed. Thus his extensive earlier 'Bridge Series', oils and drawings - the metaphorical 'bridge' was his spatial ploy, creating the spatial tension that in reality is elemental to any actual bridge: space, structure and tension.

He took up sculpture, concurrently with painting, on moving back to London in 1986, after a quarter century as a 'New York painter'. For him, space automatically is intrinsic to sculpture's dimensionality, so the ingredient of tension became prime: tensile linear balancing, contrasting textural disparities (shiny new, time-worn old), stressing the emotional stretch of a work.

The current long on-going 'Painted Drawing Series' (works large and small, canvas oils, works on paper) hopefully engages the viewer more directly with the creative self via emotional painted gestures, the 'drawing' of the brush.

Influences
His peers of influence ranged from John Sell Cotman to Richard Diebenkorn.

Public Collections 
 British Museum Permanent Collection: Prints and Drawings (six works)
 Imperial War Museum Permanent Collection  (conflict-related works)
 Indiana State University Permanent Collection

Solo exhibitions
 2007 Painted Drawing Series, The Great Hall, St Bartholomew's Hospital, Smithfield, London (more info)
 2005 The Chain of Time, Rivington Gallery, London (more info)
 2001 Michael Green - An Artists Career, Rivington Gallery, London (more info)
 1995 The Bridge Series Drawings, a retrospective, Coombs Contemporary Gallery, London
 1992 The Cyprus Works - large oils, collages, assemblage and sculpture, Morphi Gallery, Cyprus (Artist in Residence)
 1985 Planned Space Paintings, Viafora Gallery, New York City
 1982 Paintings from the Bridge Series, Hunnings Gallery, New York City
 1980 The Bridge Series, Turman Gallery, Indiana State University

Group exhibitions
 2001 Summer and Autumn, gallery artists, Rivington Gallery, London
 1998 Box Constructions (20 year survey), Megalomedia, London
 1998 Bridge Series Drawings, Megalomedia, London
 1998 Vital Art '98, Large sculptures and three-dimensional oils, Atlantis Gallery, London
 1998 Built, Planned space oils, Cowcross Gallery, Artnet, London
 1998 La Via dell'Oro Nero, Sculptures, Liguria, Italy
 1997 Painted Drawings, Oil on paper, Coombs Contemporary, London
 1996 Painted Drawings, Coombs Contemporary, London
 1996 14 large three-dimensional oils, assemblages and sculpture, Cilntec, London
 1996 Bridge Series Drawings, Austin Knight, London
 1995 Endangered Wildlife, Lamont Gallery, London
 1995 Festival Art Show, Henley, England and Co Gallery
 1995 Large Sculptures, Raw Gallery, London
 1994 Box (Box sculptures), Walsall Museum
 1994 Summer Group Show, Raw Gallery, London
 1994 Whitechapel Gallery Biennial, Open Studio Show
 1993 Art in Boxes, 4th Annual Show, England and Co. Gallery, London
 1993 The Collage Show, England and Co. Gallery, London
 1993 Art in Boxes, Castle Museum, Nottingham
 1992 Art in Boxes, 3rd Annual Show, England and Co., London
 1990 Homage to the Square, Flaxman Gallery, London

References

See also
British Library, Sound Archives, Artists' Lives, Michael Green (2012)

1929 births
Living people
20th-century British painters
British male painters
21st-century British painters
20th-century British sculptors
British male sculptors
20th-century British male artists
21st-century British male artists